Davids is an unusual patronymic surname and a variant of Davidis. The name is mostly found in Great Britain and in the Netherlands. Davids is derived from the Hebrew word for "beloved". 

The name was popularised by the story of King David, who is regarded as the greatest of the early kings of Israel and founder of the Davidic line.

The surname first migrated to England after the Norman conquest of 1066. The surname was first found in Sussex where bearers of the name were Lords of the manor of Peasmarsh in that shire, and were descendend from Robert, count of Eu, in Normandy.

The name may refer to: 
Davids, parish in Denmark
Willibrord Davids, judge and former president of the high council of the Netherlands
Aäron Davids, chief rabbi of Rotterdam
Edgar Davids, Dutch footballer
Fadlu Davids, South African soccer striker
Faiek Davids was a South African first class cricketer in the 1980s
Hendrik Jan Davids, Dutch tennis  player
Henry Davids, South African cricketer
Henry Davids (fencer), British fencer
Lance Davids, South African footballer
Lorenzo Davids, Dutch footballer
Neil Davids, English footballer
Sharice Davids, American politician and MMA fighter

Patronymic surnames